Katif was an Israeli settlement in the Gush Katif bloc in the Gaza Strip, about 1 km north of the Palestinian refugee camp of Deir al-Balah Camp.

History
Katif was founded as a moshav in 1977 by Orthodox Jews. The name is derived from the  archeological site nearby, Tel Katifa.

Katif was founded as a paramilitary Nahal settlement in 1973, and handed over to civilians in 1977. Some 70 families, or 330 people, including 220 children, lived in the moshav. A religious elementary school and a high school located there served many of the other settlements in the region. The economy was based on a plastics factory, a fabric factory, and agriculture, including a nursery and a dairy farm.

Unilateral disengagement
Like all the Israeli settlements in the Gaza Strip, Katif was evacuated as part of the unilateral disengagement plan, decided on by the Israeli government in 2004.

After their eviction, most of the families (forty-five) chose to move to a temporary refugee camp adjacent to Amatzia, a previously non-religious moshav of thirty-five families, and start planning their permanent settlement in the area.

Former Israeli settlements in the Gaza Strip
Former moshavim
Religious Israeli settlements
Nahal settlements
Villages depopulated during the Arab–Israeli conflict
1973 establishments in the Israeli Military Governorate
2005 disestablishments in the Palestinian territories